Joyce Penelope Jacobsen is a former President of Hobart and William Smith Colleges. Dr. Jacobsen was elected as the 29th President of Hobart College and the 18th President of William Smith College. Jacobsen is a scholar of economics, an award-winning teacher and an experienced administrator. She began her presidency on July 1, 2019. She is the first woman to serve as president of Hobart and William Smith Colleges.

Jacobsen was the Andrews Professor of Economics at Wesleyan University, Middletown. She was also president of the International Association for Feminist Economics (IAFFE) from 2016 to 2017. In 2021, she was awarded the Carolyn Shaw Bell Award for furthering the status of women in the economics profession.

Education 
Jacobsen earned her A.B. from Harvard University in 1982 and her Ph.D. from Stanford University in 1991.

Awards 
 2007 Binswanger Prize for Excellence in Teaching

Bibliography

Books

Chapters in books 
  Also available online.

Journal articles 

 
 
 
 
 
  (The journal has since been renamed: The Journal of Behavioral and Experimental Economics.)
 
 
 
 
 
 
 
 
 
 
 
 
 
  (Edited by: Solomon W. Polachek; Konstantinos Tatsiramos; and Klaus F. Zimmermann.)

See also 
 International Association for Feminist Economics

References

External links 
 Profile page: Joyce P. Jacobsen Wesleyan University
 Profile page: Joyce P. Jacobsen International Association for Feminist Economics
 Interview with Joyce P. Jacobsen Wesleyan University

American women economists
21st-century American economists
American educational theorists
American development economists
Feminist economists
Harvard University alumni
Living people
Place of birth missing (living people)
Stanford University alumni
Wesleyan University faculty
1961 births
21st-century American women writers
Presidents of the International Association for Feminist Economics